Filip Mihaljević (born 31 July 1994) is a Croatian discus thrower and shot putter.

Early life
He was born in Bosnia and Herzegovina but moved to Split, Croatia. Until the age of 17 he played football, eventually switching to shot put. When he began he was a natural and many people around him believed he would eventually be an impressive discus thrower because of his build.

NCAA
He is currently living in Charlottesville, Virginia attending the University of Virginia, where he is training under the tutelage of UVA Throws coach Martin Maric. Filip Mihaljević is a 3 time NCAA Division 1 Champion, 10 time All-American, 10 time Atlantic Coast Conference Champion, 2017 The Bowerman Award Semifinalist & 2017 ACC Outdoor Field Performer of the Year.

Career

On 23 January 2016 Mihaljević won the shot put competition at Rod McCravy Memorial in Lexington, Kentucky with 20.69 m and thus qualified to the 2016 Olympic Games in Rio de Janeiro.

On 18 March 2016, competing at his very first senior world championships, in Portland, Mihaljević won the bronze medal in shot put competition with 20.87 m, his personal best.

In 2017, Filip become one of the few throwers who managed to capture both NCAA Outdoor Shot Put and Discus titles with impressive 21.30m and 63.76m respectively.

References

External links

1994 births
Living people
Sportspeople from Livno
Croatian male discus throwers
Croatian male shot putters
Olympic athletes of Croatia
Bosnia and Herzegovina male discus throwers
Bosnia and Herzegovina male shot putters
Croats of Bosnia and Herzegovina
Athletes (track and field) at the 2016 Summer Olympics
Athletes (track and field) at the 2020 Summer Olympics
Virginia Cavaliers men's track and field athletes
European Athletics Championships winners
World Athletics Indoor Championships medalists
21st-century Croatian people